Alvania schwartziana is a species of minute sea snail, a marine gastropod mollusk or micromollusk in the family Rissoidae.

The specific name schwartziana is in honor of Gustav Franziskus Maria Schwartz von Mohrenstern.

Description

Distribution

References

Rissoidae
Gastropods described in 1866
Taxa named by Spiridon Brusina